Venner  may refer to:

an Early Modern High German term for banneret (modern German Fähnrich)
a surname:

 Dominique Venner, French historian, journalist and essayist
 K. Dwight Venner, governor of the Eastern Caribbean Central Bank 
 Stephen Venner, a bishop of the Church of England
 Thomas Venner, (beheaded 19 January 1661) was a  cooper and rebel
 Tobias Venner, (1577–1660) English physician and medical writer
 Venner (Kent cricketer)

  Charlie Venner, a character in  Straw Dogs (1971 film)

See also
 Bamses Venner, Danish musical group
 Venner, a 1960 Norwegian film